Alexandre Krasnoroutskiy and Denys Molchanov were the defending champions, but only Molchanov tried to defend his title.
He teamed up with Yang Tsung-hua and they won this tournament, by defeating Pierre-Ludovic Duclos and Alexey Kedryuk 4–6, 7–6(5), [11–9] in the final.

Seeds

Draw

Draw

References
 Doubles Draw

Almaty Cup - Doubles
Almaty Cup